Lockatong may refer to:

Lockatong Creek, a New Jersey tributary of the Delaware River
Lockatong Formation, a mapped bedrock unit in Pennsylvania, New Jersey, and New York